GameChanger is a US-based technology company whose mobile app and website provide scorekeeping, stats, video streaming, and recap stories to teams and connected fans at the local level. The platform supports features for sports including baseball, softball, and basketball.

Over 24 million games have been scored on GameChanger corresponding to over 500,000 active scoring teams across multiple sports in all age groups.

GameChanger is free for coaches, scorekeepers and team admins. GameChanger uses the Freemium model to generate most of its revenue. Some content, such as live game scores and game stat overviews, is free and accessible to all with a GameChanger account. Premium Fan Content, such as a live GameStream of plays, box scores, season stats, recap stories, and in-game alerts, requires a monthly or yearly Fan Subscription.

How it works 
The concept is that by providing free software to coaches in exchange for their information, GameChanger can collect and manage a massive pool of information that is valuable to parents and fans, making an impact in a market (amateur sports) that is inherently decentralized. Any coach, scorekeeper or team representative can create their team, roster and schedule on the GameChanger website or the GameChanger mobile app. During the game, a Team Admin records the action on the free GameChanger app—tapping simple menus to score every play. A live GameStream of plays and stats is instantly delivered to fans following from the GameChanger website or their mobile devices. After the game, 150 stats, spray charts and game recap stories become available online.

History 

GameChanger was launched in 2010 by co-founders Ted Sullivan and Kiril Savino. In fall of 2010, GameChanger and Little League teamed up to launch the Little League Scorekeeper. Powered by GameChanger software, it is the only Authorized Little League scorekeeping application. MaxPreps, the Cal Ripken World Series, Perfect Game, and USA Baseball all became partners in 2011. On May 31, 2012, the 1 millionth game was scored on GameChanger. Given that fewer than 1 million games have been played in the history of the "Big Four" professional sports combined, GameChanger has a claim to having collected the largest collection of sports data in the world. In late 2016, GameChanger was acquired by DICK’S Sporting Goods. In April 2018, GameChanger announced a partnership with the National Federation of State High School Associations.

In June 2018, the company branched out to the clinic business following a new partnership with USA Baseball. GameChanger is currently led by Sameer Ahuja and is wholly owned by DICK'S Sporting Goods.

Stats 

GameChanger automatically calculates over 150 stats for baseball and softball teams. GameChanger is the first company to attempt to quantify the Quality At-Bat when it created its QAB stat. The QAB stat is a developmental stat that attempts to minimize the effect of luck while valuing the batting process over the results of the at-bat.

Analytics and artificial intelligence 

A huge part of coaching now includes analytics. An article by Manyika writes, "Innovations in digitization, analytics, artificial intelligence, and automation are creating performance and productivity opportunities for business and the economy, even as they reshape employment and the future of work. (2017)" Analytics have also been implemented into baseball more than any other sport. Analytic software have been created to track data on the most likely scenario of all players on all teams. A quote from MLB.com claimed, "One thing virtually every baseball executive agrees on is that we have just started to scratch the surface on the impact analytics ultimately will have on the sport. (2017)" It collects data for both teams and then presents the data to the coaches like a hitters most likely place to hit the ball, or the likelihood that a batter will hit a curveball better than a fastball (GC). This is used by almost all high school coaches and has really changed in game coaching. Gamechanger uses artificial intelligence technology to produce an automated journalism report after each game and give a live play by play to fans or parents that cannot attend a game but would like to follow along.

References 

GameChanger Baseball, Softball. (G.C). Retrieved from GameChanger Baseball, Softball
Manyika, J., What's now and next in analytics, AI, and automation. McKinsey & Company, May 2017.
Richard, J., Major league clubs eyeing future of analytics. MLB.com March 2017.

External links

Mobile software
Youth baseball
Youth basketball